Stefan Glogovac (born June 13, 1994) is a Bosnian professional basketball player for Târgu Jiu of the Liga Națională. and the ABA League Second Division.

References

External links
draftexpress.com
eurobasket.com
fibaeurope.com

1994 births
Living people
ABA League players
Bosnia and Herzegovina men's basketball players
Bosnia and Herzegovina expatriate basketball people in Serbia
KK Mega Basket players
KK Igokea players
OKK Spars players
OKK Borac players
Power forwards (basketball)
People from Trebinje
Serbs of Bosnia and Herzegovina